Ladies Night is the third studio album by English girl group Atomic Kitten. It was released by Innocent Records and Virgin Records on 10 November 2003 in the United Kingdom. Named after the same-titled 1979 song by American band Kool & the Gang, the trio reteamed with producers Ash Howes and Martin Harrington, both of whom had contributed to their previous album Feels So Good (2002), to work with them on the majority of the album, while additional production was provided by  Ciaron Bell, Julian Gallagher, and Steve Robson, Richard "Biff" Stannard and The True North Music Company. Written and recorded in a time span of seven months, the band co-wrote on eight songs of the album's standard version, with Jenny Frost and Liz McClarnon each credited as songwriters on three tracks, while Natasha Hamilton co-wrote two.

Upon its release, Ladies Night earned largely mixed reviews from music critics many of whom noted a progression from the band's early material but found that the album lacked creativity and variety. It debuted and peaked at number five on the UK Albums Chart, becoming their third consecutive top five album, and was cerified Platinum by the British Phonographic Industry (BPI) within its first three weeks of release. Elsewhere, the album reached the top ten in Austria, New Zealand, and Scotland. Ladies Night was preceded by lead single "If You Come to Me," which became a top ten in several countries, while later singles include a cover version of "Ladies Night." The third and final single "Someone like Me" was released on 29 March 2004 and became the group's official last single following the announcement of their indefinite hiatus.

Background
In April 2003, the compilation album Atomic Kitten was released in the United States, which consisted of tracks from their first two albums Right Now (2000) and Feels So Good (2002). It was commercially unsuccessful, although single "The Tide Is High (Get the Feeling)" appeared on the soundtrack for the Disney Channel Original Movie The Lizzie McGuire Movie (2003). Following this, the group opted to focus solely on the European, Oceanian, South African and Asian markets and began work on their third album.

Before recording started, American R&B group Kool & the Gang approached the group about a collaboration for their album of duets, The Hits: Reloaded (2004). Kool & the Gang wanted to record an updated version of their hit "Ladies Night" and were looking for a girl group to sing the lyrics. Atomic Kitten liked the idea and inquired whether they could use it for their next album which was subsequently named Ladies Night in honour of this collaboration. Atomic Kitten spent late 2002 and early 2003 in the studio recording their third studio album. Up until the recording of Ladies Night, the group mainly relied on songwriters, though they had occasionally co-written songs featured on their albums. While recording Ladies Night, they decided to be directly involved in the creation of eight of the fifteen songs.

Critical reception

Caroline Bansal, writing for musicOMH, complimented the album's first three tracks, but noted a "certain uniformity" among the rest of album. She found that "this seems almost wholly due to the dreadful drum machine that appears on practically every number. No matter how soulfully the girls sing, you feel that the insistently chirpy beat will go on regardless to keep them in line, with all the depth of feeling of a metronome. Which is a shame. Some of the songs [...] sound like they could be really strong if they only had a live band to rise above the two-dimensional pop beat." Alexander Cordas from German music website laut.de credited Ladies Night with a "terrible lack of creativity."

AllMusic editor Jon O'Brien rated the album three stars out of five. He found that majority of the "tracks stick with the Stargate-esque watered-down R&B, breezy acoustic pop, and midtempo ballads of its predecessor, Feels So Good [...] There are times on Ladies Night when the girls appear capable of losing their "female Westlife" tag, while the increased creative input is a promising progression from their manufactured early days, but frustratingly, it plays it too safe too often to be considered as anything other than a harmless and slightly forgettable piece of fluff." Betty Clarke from The Guardian felt that the "album reveals the shaky nature of their stature: it has just one prospective hit and a dubious cover of a 1980s single, both lost in a sea of generic disco."

Chart performance
Ladies Night debuted and peaked at number five on the UK Albums Chart, selling 48,000 copies in its first week of release. It was a considerable decline from the band's previous two studio albums Right Now (2000) and Feels So Good (2002), both of which had been certified double platinum by the British Phonographic Industry (BPI) and became number-one hits. A steady seller, Ladies Night was however certified platinum by the BPI for the shipment of over 550,000 copies in the United Kingdom.

Track listing

Notes and sample credits
 denotes co-producer
 denotes additional producer
"Be with You" contains a sample from "Last Train to London" performed by Electric Light Orchestra.

Charts

Weekly charts

Year-end charts

Certifications

Release history

References

External links

2003 albums
Atomic Kitten albums
Albums produced by Stargate
Albums produced by Ash Howes
Albums produced by Richard Stannard (songwriter)